The Francisco Linares Alcántara Municipality is one of the 18 municipalities (municipios) that makes up the Venezuelan state of Aragua and, according to the 2011 census by the National Institute of Statistics of Venezuela, the municipality has a population of 123,122. The town of Santa Rita is the shire town of the Francisco Linares Alcántara Municipality.

Demographics
The Francisco Linares Alcántara Municipality, according to a 2007 population estimate by the National Institute of Statistics of Venezuela, has a population of 135,873 (up from 118,146 in 2000). This amounts to 8.2% of the state's population.

Government
The mayor of the Francisco Linares Alcántara Municipality is Raiza Márquez, elected on November 23, 2008, with 56% of the vote. She replaced Hugo R. Peña A. shortly after the elections. The municipality is divided into three parishes; Capital Francisco Linares Alcántara, Francisco de Miranda (separated from Capital Francisco Linares Alcantara parish effective January 30, 1995), and Monseñor Feliciano González (separated from Francisco de Miranda parish effective December 16, 1997).

See also
Santa Rita
Aragua
Municipalities of Venezuela

References

External links
franciscolinaresalcantara-aragua.gob.ve 

Municipalities of Aragua